Henriette Gottlieb (Berlin, 1884 – Łódź Ghetto, 2 January 1942) was a German soprano.

Gottlieb was born in Berlin. She performed the Wagnerian role of Brünnhilde in the Théâtre des Champs-Élysées, Paris, in a 1928 performance of Der Ring der Nibelung, when she was a young and promising singer.

She performed in the premieres of the operas Die Hügelmühle by Friedrich Koch (Berlin, 1918) and Holofernes of Emil von Reznicek (Berlin, 1923). Following the Nazi ban on Jewish performers, she lived in Berlin until she was deported to the Łódź Ghetto (in the General Government region of occupied Poland) in 1941. She died on 2 January 1942.

She was noted for her performances and recordings of Wagner's Brünnhilde:

Recordings
 Fidelio — Quartets from Acts I and II
 mp3 ♪ Wagner - 'Die Walküre': "Nun zäume dein Ross" (with Ludwig Weber; Paris, 1930) ♪

References

External links
 Photo of Henriette Gottlieb
 Opera Nederland webpage, by Mark Duijnstee Article in Dutch with photo Article also has photos and short bios in Dutch of other victims of the Holocaust: Richard Breitenfeld, Grete Forst, Juan Luria, Theodore Ritch, and Ottilie Metzger.

German sopranos
1884 births
1942 deaths
Singers from Berlin
People who died in the Łódź Ghetto
German civilians killed in World War II
20th-century German women  opera singers
German Jews who died in the Holocaust
Jewish opera singers